Quercus agrifolia, the California live oak, or coast live oak, is a highly variable, often evergreen oak tree, a type of live oak, native to the California Floristic Province. It may be shrubby, depending on age and growing location, but is generally a medium-sized tree.  It grows west of the Sierra Nevada mountain range from Mendocino County, California, south to northern Baja California in Mexico. It is classified in the red oak section of oaks (Quercus sect. Lobatae).

This species is commonly sympatric with canyon live oak (Q. chrysolepis), and the two may be hard to distinguish because their spinose leaves are superficially similar.

Description

Some specimens may attain an age exceeding 1,000 years. Examples of this include the Grand Oak of Cherry Valley, California, the Encino Oak Tree, which died in the 1990s (part of the stump has been preserved) and the Pechanga Great Oak.

The trunk, particularly for older individuals, may be highly contorted, massive and gnarled. The crown is broadly rounded and dense, especially when aged 20 to 70 years; in later life the trunk and branches are more well defined and the leaf density lower.

The outer layers of leaves are designed for maximum solar absorption, containing two to three layers of photosynthetic cells.

These outer leaves are deemed to be small in size to more efficiently re-radiate the heat gained from solar capture. Shaded leaves are generally broader and thinner, having only a single layer of photosynthetic cells. The convex leaf shape may be useful for interior leaves which depend on capturing reflected light scattered in random directions from the outer canopy.

Recognized varieties
There are two varieties of Quercus agrifolia:

Hybridity
Several hybrids between coast live oak and other red oak species have been documented. Hybrids with interior live oak (Q. wislizenii) are known in many areas in northern California. Coast live oak also hybridizes with Shreve oak (Q. parvula var. shrevei). All these oak species show evidence of introgression with one another.

Etymology
In naming the species, Née compared it to a species illustrated in Leonard Plukenet's Phytographia under the descriptive name "Ilex folio agrifolii americana, forte agria, vel aquifolia glandifera" which Plukenet had compared, in his Almagestum botanicum, to Luigi Anguillara's Agrifolia glandifera, the noun 'Agrifolia' being a Medieval Latin form of 'Aquifolium' meaning a holly or holly-leaved oak, and related to the Modern Italian 'Agrifoglio,' meaning 'holly.'

Distribution and habitat

Normally the tree is found on well-drained soils of coastal hills and plains, often near year-round or perennial streams. It may be found in several natural communities including coast live oak woodland, Engelmann oak woodland, valley oak woodland and both northern and southern mixed evergreen forests.

It is the only California native oak that thrives in the coastal environment, although it is rare on the immediate shore; it enjoys the mild winter and summer climate afforded by ocean proximity, and it is somewhat tolerant of aerosol-borne sea salt. The coastal fog supplies relief from the rainless California summer heat.

It is the dominant overstory plant of the coast live oak woodland habitat, often joined by California bay laurel and California buckeye north of Big Sur. Associated understory plants include toyon, various manzanitas and western poison-oak.

Ecology 
The California oak moth (Phryganidia californica) caterpillar subsists entirely on living and fallen leaves of the Coast Live Oak. In 8–10 year cycles, the caterpillar will appear in sufficient abundance to denude healthy trees. The trees recover, and botanists speculate that the species provide mutual benefit, possibly in the form of fertilizer for the oak. The coast live oak is also the only known foodplant of Chionodes vanduzeei caterpillars.

Live oak trees, among other western oaks, are also known to support acorn woodpeckers, which store their acorns in tree trunks and remove them when they want to eat.

Allergenicity 
The pollen of the coast live oak is a severe allergen. Pollination occurs in spring.

Uses

Historical

At least twelve distinct cultures of Native Americans are known to have consumed the acorns as a dietary staple. The seeds were ground into meal, which after being washed was boiled into mush or baked in ashes to make bread. In the 18th century, Spaniards in the San Fernando Valley used the wood for charcoal to fire kilns in making adobe. Later this form of charcoal would be utilized in the baking, gunpowder and electric power industries.

In the 18th and 19th centuries shipbuilders sought out the odd angular branches to make special joints. Pioneers moving west would harvest small amounts for making farm implements and wagon wheels, but the greatest impact was the wholesale clearing of oak woodlands to erect sprawling cities such as San Diego and San Francisco. The irregular shape often let the tree escape widespread harvest for building timbers, and also led the early settlers to endow the coast live oak with mystical qualities. Its stateliness has made it a subject of historical landscape painters throughout California modern history since the mid-19th century.

Modern
Coast live oak has also become a common addition to western US landscaping. It is however sensitive to changes in grading and drainage; in particular, it is important to respect the root crown level and avoid adding soil near the trunk when construction or landscaping occurs.

Also, if incorporating it into a landscaping scheme with artificial irrigation, it is important to avoid regular watering within the oak's drip line (canopy), since wet soil in the summer increases infection rates by soil-borne Phytophthora diseases like sudden oak death.

Culture
The coast live oak, especially in its Spanish forms encino or encina, encinitas "little oaks", and encinal "oak grove", gave its name to seven land grants across California and to many communities and geographic features. These include Rancho Los Encinos, the Los Angeles community of Encino, Encinitas near San Diego, and Encinal del Temescal, now the city of Oakland.

Paso Robles (fully 'El Paso de Robles' or 'Pass of the Oaks') also refers to the ubiquitous live oaks in the region as a geographical place name.

References

Bibliography

External links 

 
 Las Pilitas: California Oaks
 Virginia Tech Forestry Department: Coast Live Oak
 USDA Plants Database: Quercus agrifolia Née
 Interactive Distribution Map for Quercus agrifolia

agrifolia
Flora of California
Trees of Baja California
Natural history of the California chaparral and woodlands
Natural history of the California Coast Ranges
Natural history of the Central Valley (California)
Plants described in 1801
Natural history of the Channel Islands of California
Natural history of the San Francisco Bay Area
Natural history of the Santa Monica Mountains
Natural history of the Transverse Ranges
Plants used in Native American cuisine
Pre-Columbian California cuisine
Trees of Mediterranean climate
Garden plants of North America
Drought-tolerant trees
Ornamental trees
Oaks of Mexico